Lake Colden is a  lake located in the Adirondack High Peaks in New York, United States. To the northwest lie the MacIntyre Mountains—  Algonquin Peak (the second highest mountain in the state),  Boundary Peak,  Iroquois Peak and  Mount Marshall. Lake Colden is fed by Avalanche Lake, to the northeast and in turn feeds Flowed Lands, to the southwest.

Being in the heart of the High Peaks, the area is very popular with hikers. The New York State Department of Environmental Conservation maintains an Interior Outpost on the western shore. There are a number of campsites and lean-tos in the area.

Lake Colden was named after David C. Colden in 1836; Colden was an investor in the Tahawus iron works of Archibald MacIntyre.

Images

References

Colden
Adirondack Park
Colden